The 2020 Boston Cannons Lacrosse season was the 20th season in club history and their last season in the Major League Lacrosse. It would be a successful sendoff, as the Cannons would win the last MLL Championship. They would play their games at Veterans Memorial Stadium (Quincy, Massachusetts).

Regular season
The Cannons would win 3 of 5 games, finishing the season at 3-2 and earning the 4th playoff seed.

Playoffs
After the #2 and #3 seeded teams were disqualified from playoffs due to players testing positive for covid-19, the Cannons would face the Denver Outlaws in the championship. The Cannons would go on to win the last ever MLL game 13-10.

See also
2020 Major League Lacrosse season
 2021 Cannons Lacrosse Club season

References

Lacrosse in Boston
Major League Lacrosse seasons
2020 in lacrosse